The 1997–98 FC Bayern Munich season was Bayern Munich's 33rd consecutive season in the Bundesliga, the top division of German football. After they won the title in the previous season, Bayern have been only second behind promoted team 1. FC Kaiserslautern. At Olympiastadion Berlin, Bayern beat MSV Duisburg 2–1 in the 1998 DFB-Pokal final, which meant the first DFB-Pokal title since 1986. In the UEFA Champions League Bayern were eliminated in the quarterfinals after extra time by national rival and cup holder Borussia Dortmund.

Background

Transfers

Pre-season
Key

DFB-Ligapokal

Bundesliga

Match results

Classification

Results summary

Results by round

DFB-Pokal

Champions League

Bayern Munich qualified for the group stage of the 1997–98 UEFA Champions League by finishing first in the Bundesliga in 1996–97.

Group stage

Knockout stage

Quarter-finals

Player statistics
Numbers in parentheses denote appearances as substitute.

References

FC Bayern Munich seasons
Bayern Munich season 1997-98